Chloe McConville (born 1 October 1987) is an Australian professional racing cyclist. She rides for the Orica–AIS team. Before becoming a cyclist, McConville was a cross-country skier, racing for the Australian national team from 2002 to 2009, and competed at the 2006 FIS Nordic Junior World Ski Championships and the 2007 Winter Universiade. She originally took up cycling at the age of twenty as a form of cross-training. She has a bachelor's degree in physiotherapy from the University of Melbourne.

See also
 List of 2015 UCI Women's Teams and riders

References

External links
 

1987 births
Living people
Australian female cyclists
Australian female cross-country skiers
People from Myrtleford
Sportswomen from Victoria (Australia)
20th-century Australian women
21st-century Australian women